Advancing Secondary Science Education through Tetrahymena (ASSET) is an organization at Cornell University that is dedicated to expanding the use of the protist Tetrahymena in K-12 classrooms.  They are funded by the National Institutes of Health through the SEPA (Science Education Partnership Award) Program.  Although their name includes the word "secondary," they have worked in recent years to develop materials for students in elementary, middle and high schools.  The group develops modules, which are stand-alone labs or lessons that can be inserted into the curriculum of a class at the discretion of the teacher.

Modules

Modules are designed to be stand-alone lessons that fit into and compliment a life science curriculum.  The ASSET program ships all the equipment that is needed to complete the modules to the teacher in a reusable plastic container, at ASSET's expense. The teacher who requested the materials can use them for up to two weeks.  At the end of the two weeks, the teacher uses a pre-paid return label to send the materials back in the same container.  Some materials, such as live cells, may be sent separately to provide for a chance for the culture to be established in the teacher's classroom.

Science Modules

ASSET has created fifteen science modules, each of which addresses a particular topic relevant to life science education in United States school curricula.

Cannibalism and Interspecific Predation

This module utilizes two species of Tetrahymena:  Tetrahymena thermophilia and Tetrahymena vorax.   In the lab, an extract, called stomatin, is made from the thermophilia, then placed into the vorax culture.  There, it induces a transformation from the microstome form to the macrostome form in T. vorax.  This transformation is most notable by a marked increase in the size of the cell (doubling or sometimes more), the resorption of the microstomal oral apparatus and the construction of a much larger macrostomal oral apparatus.  This transformation allows the macrostomal T. vorax cells to prey on T. thermophilia, but also to cannibalize the microstomes of their own species.

Science and Society Modules

ASSET has also created five science and society modules, which are designed to integrate social studies and science education into one unit.

Elementary School Modules

External links
 https://tetrahymenaasset.vet.cornell.edu/

References

Cornell University
Education advocacy groups
Science education